Hicham Khaddari (born 19 August 1991) is a Moroccan former professional tennis player.

Khaddari played for Morocco's Davis Cup team from 2011 to 2014, appearing in a total of six ties, for four singles and one doubles win. His only Futures title win was as a qualifier in Sharm El Sheikh in 2013 and he made his ATP Tour main draw debut came at the 2014 Grand Prix Hassan II in Casablanca, the city of his birth. He fell in the first round of the Grand Prix Hassan to a former finalist Victor Hănescu in two sets, losing the first in a tiebreak.

ITF Futures titles

Singles: (1)

See also
List of Morocco Davis Cup team representatives

References

External links
 
 
 

1991 births
Living people
Moroccan male tennis players
Sportspeople from Casablanca